The genus Sauropus, of the family Phyllanthaceae, comprises about 40 species of herbs, shrubs or subshrubs, sometimes with woody bases. These plants can be monoecious or dioecious. They are distributed in Southeast Asia, Malesia and Australia.

Taxonomy
In a 2006 revision of the Phyllanthaceae, it was recommended that Sauropus be subsumed in Phyllanthus; however, new combinations in Phyllanthus for former Sauropus species remain to be published.

Description
Sauropus species have alternate, entire leaves with short petioles and small stipules. Flowers appear at axils and mainly form clusters. There are 6 perianth segments divided in 2 whorls, with female flowers often having bigger perianths. At male flowers, the perianth is tube-like, with 3 stamen. The fruit is berry-like, ovoid or globose, and fleshy.

Species include
Sauropus albiflorus
Sauropus amabilis
Sauropus amoebiflorous
Sauropus androgynus - star gooseberry, katuk
Sauropus arenosus
Sauropus assimilis
Sauropus asteranthos
Sauropus bacciformis
Sauropus bicolor
Sauropus brevipes
Sauropus brunonis
Sauropus convollerioides
Sauropus crassifolius
Sauropus discocalyx
Sauropus ditassoides
Sauropus garrettii
Sauropus glaucus
Sauropus gracilis
Sauropus granulosus
Sauropus heteroblastus
Sauropus hirsutus
Sauropus hirtellus
Sauropus kerrii
Sauropus macranthus
Sauropus ochrophyllus
Sauropus orbicularis
Sauropus pauciflorus
Sauropus poomae
Sauropus pulchellus
Sauropus quadrangularis
Sauropus ramosissimus
Sauropus rimaphilus
Sauropus rhamnoides
Sauropus rhytidospermus
Sauropus rigens
Sauropus rostatus
Sauropus similis
Sauropus spatulifolius
Sauropus suberosus
Sauropus subterblancus
Sauropus thorelii
Sauropus thyrsiflorus
Sauropus trachyspermus
Sauropus villosus

Formerly placed here
Sauropus elegantissimus has become Breynia retusa.

References

 
Malpighiales genera